Buruk may refer to:

 Buruk, Sarıçam, a village in Adana Province, Turkey
 Okan Buruk, Turkish footballer

Turkish-language surnames